Alfa Romeo Tipo A or Alfa Romeo Tipo A Monoposto was the first monoposto (single-seater) racing car, designed by Alfa Romeo. The car had two 6C 1750 straight-6 engines and gearboxes assembled side by side.

The car's best racing achievement was in the Coppa Acerbo of 1931; Tazio Nuvolari was third with Giuseppe Campari winning. Luigi Arcangeli was killed at Monza in 1931 while practising with this car for the Italian GP. The car's complex design ultimately led to it being very unreliable; Jano started to design a new car, the Tipo B (P3), to fix this problem. The Tipo A was made in only four examples and only 
one replica exists today in Alfa Romeo Historical Museum in Arese.

Notes

References

Grand Prix cars
Tipo A